Waiting for Fidel is a Canadian documentary by Michael Rubbo and starring director Rubbo, former Premier of Newfoundland and Labrador Joey Smallwood and Newfoundland media mogul Geoff Stirling. It depicts Rubbo, Smallwood, and Stirling's unsuccessful attempt to interview Cuban leader Fidel Castro.

Synopsis 
Two Canadians, former premier of Newfoundland Joey Smallwood and broadcaster Geoff Stirling, travel to Cuba in a private jet. They attempt to meet Fidel Castro to discuss Cuba–United States relations, but Castro never shows up. Instead, much of the film consists of discussions between progressive Smallwood and free-marketer Stirling about the effects of the Castro regime.

The film's name is a take on the play Waiting for Godot, which has a similar conceit of two men conversing while they await a guest who never arrives.

Critical reception and influence
New York Times film reviewer Richard Eder observed that "It is about Cuba, in a way, but it is also about the difficulty in seeing Cuba for what it may be." The film has been cited as an inspiration for director Michael Moore.

References

Works cited

External links

Waiting for Fidel full movie from CJON-DT

National Film Board of Canada documentaries
Documentary films about Cuba
Documentary films about Fidel Castro
1974 films
1974 documentary films
Films directed by Michael Rubbo
Cinema of Newfoundland and Labrador
Films produced by Tom Daly
Documentary films about Canadian politics
Documentary films about politicians
1970s English-language films
1970s Canadian films